Bur Salah  is a town in the north-central Mudug region of Somalia.  It is situated between Beyra and Rigomane.

Transportation
A highway connects Bur Salah with Galkayo, the capital of the Mudug region.

Education
Bur Salah currently has several primary and secondary institutions, as well as many Islamic schools (madrassahs).

References

HISTORY OF READ HORN OF AFRICA (BUR SALAH PROJECTS)

Populated places in Mudug